Karl Novak (October 19, 1905 – 1975) was a Yugoslav Slovene military officer best known as commander of the Slovene Chetniks in the Italian-annexed Province of Ljubljana (part of modern-day Slovenia) during World War II.

Early life 
Novak was born in Pula in 1905. After he graduated from high school in Maribor, he attended the military academy.

Before World War II, Novak was a major in the Yugoslav Royal Army.

World War II 
After the Axis invasion of Yugoslavia in April, 1941 Novak went to headquarters of Draža Mihailović at Ravna Gora together with Jaka Avšič. Novak was instructed by Mihailović to infiltrate the headquarters of the communist forces in Slovenia, but this attempt failed because the Slovenian communists were warned by the communist headquarters from Užice.

In February 1943, Novak, Draža Mihailović's chief representative in the province, having tried for many months to get the Slovene Alliance to place some of their forces under his command, formed his own militia, known as the Blue Guard (also known as the "Slovene Chetniks"). All major resistance factions in Slovenia had their representatives in Novak's headquarters, including Slovenian Legion, National Legion and Sokol Legion. Novak was the only Chetnik commander who exercised complete political and military control over units under his nominal command. However, this unit never grew larger than 400 troops, and because Novak had no political base in Slovenia, it was never a significant military or political force. After the war, Novak claimed that the Royal Yugoslav Army in Slovenia had armed encounters with Italian troops and gathered intelligence on the Italians for Mihailović, but according to the historian Jozo Tomasevich the first claim is groundless as the Italians allocated an operational zone to Novak's principal unit and indirectly provided it with supplies, and its size and restrictions on its movement precluded the gathering of much useful intelligence.

Near Novo Mesto, in August 1943 Novak established the Ljubljana Chetnik Detachment. Major Novak was in Ljubljana during the Battle of Grčarice and commanded his units through radio connection. After the defeat of his units in this battle, Major Novak went to Rome to avoid German attempts to arrest him in Ljubljana. On December 25, 1943 Mihailović promoted Novak to the rank of lieutenant colonel. In January 1944 Novak and Dobrosav Jevđević, head of Mihailović's intelligence service in Italy, established a Chetnik military unit in the Slovenian Littoral and established its first detachment in the Gorizia Hills. Novak was some kind of envoy for Mihailović with the Allies in Italy and had the intention of using this new Chetnik unit as the nucleus for new Chetnik action in Slovenia, and so he requested that Mihailovic's headquarters obtain financial support from the Yugoslav embassy in Switzerland.

Novak died in Athens in 1975.

References

Sources

Further reading 
 
 KOROŠEC, I., MIHAILOVIĆ, D., & NOVAK, K. I. (2007). V spomin: [Drža Mihailović in Karel Novak]. Vestnik Zveze Slovencev V Inozemstvu. 28-32.
CIA archive document about activity of Karl Novak 1941-1945.

1905 births
1975 deaths
People from Pula
People from Austrian Littoral
Chetnik personnel of World War II
Slovenian Chetnik personnel of World War II